Maj. Gen.(ret.) Yoav Har-Even is president and CEO of Rafael Advanced Defense Systems Ltd. 
Before joining Rafael in 2015, he served as head of the Israel Defense Forces Operations Directorate. Prior to that, he was commander of the 319th Division and head of the GOC Army Headquarters.

Background
Maj. Gen.(ret.) Har-Even has been president and CEO of Rafael since 2015. Before joining Rafael he served in the Israeli Defense Force (IDF) for 34 years in various positions. He started his military career in the IDF Artillery Corps. Between 1993 and 1995, he was commander of the Pillar of Fire Artillery Formation 55th Battalion. He later commanded an Artillery Corps Officers School at Shivta Base. In 1997, he was appointed head of the Chief of Staff Office, serving under Shaul Mofaz. In 2000, he was promoted to colonel and appointed commander of the reserve 973 Eged Artillery Battalion. In 2002, he was appointed commander of the Pillar of Fire Artillery Formation. In 2005, he was promoted to brigadier general and appointed commander of the HaMapatz Armored Corps Formation. He served in this capacity during the Second Lebanon War, as well as commanding a company and battalion commanders training course at the same time.

Promotions
From September 2008 to August 2011, he was head of Manpower Directorate Planning Division and head of the GOC Army Headquarters. He was a project manager in the General Staff Planning Directorate. In August 2012, he was promoted to major general. From September 2012, he was head of the Operations Directorate.

Family
He is the son of Avi Har-Even, who was the fifth Director General of the Israel Space Agency. He is married and a father of three. He has a bachelor's degree in economics and political science, and a master's degree in business from Tel Aviv University.

References

Bibliography

External links
 Ynet Updates
 Arutz Sheva
 Yoav Har-Even, The Battlefield – From Cooperation and Integration to Fusion of Capabilities 

Israeli generals
Living people
Tel Aviv University alumni
Year of birth missing (living people)
Israeli people of Romanian-Jewish descent